Schönburg may refer to:

Places
 Schönburg (Saale),  is a municipality in the Burgenlandkreis district, in Saxony-Anhalt

Castles
 Schönburg (Rhein), a castle in Oberwesel, Rheinland-Pfalz
 Schönburg Castle, a castle in Schönburg (Saale) near Naumburg, Sachsen-Anhalt

Other
 House of Schönburg